Pop Trash is the tenth studio album by English new wave band Duran Duran. It was released on 19 June 2000 by Hollywood Records. Pop Trash was the band's first release after parting ways with EMI, with whom they had been signed since 1981. It was also the last to feature the trio of Simon Le Bon, Nick Rhodes and Warren Cuccurullo. The CD album went out of print in 2001. It was the only album the band released under Hollywood Records. After the album's poor sales, Duran Duran's contract with the label was terminated, and they would not release an album until 2004's Astronaut. The album artwork, created by Andrew Day, features a rhinestone-encrusted car that belonged to Liberace.

From July 2008, the album was made available for sale digitally through the iTunes Store in the United States and Europe, along with Medazzaland. In 2021, the band signed a deal for the album with BMG (along with Medazzaland, Astronaut and Red Carpet Massacre) which saw it being re-issued in the UK on various digital platforms. A CD reissue was released on August 19 2022.

Background
The band left Capitol Records in 1998 and signed with Hollywood Records, a subsidiary of The Walt Disney Company. Vocalist and lyricist Le Bon, increasingly unhappy with the band's situation and the departure of bassist John Taylor, was suffering from a severe case of writer's block during the making of this album.  In his stead, keyboard player Rhodes and guitarist Cuccurullo took on more of the songwriting than usual, reworking some of their TV Mania material into some of the songs on the album.

Pop Trash continues where Medazzaland (1997) left off; elements of rock, synthpop and electronica fused together, with many layers of production. The album is probably one of Duran Duran's most diverse, with songs like "Lava Lamp" including flanged drums and intricate guitars, the catty "Mars Meets Venus" and bizarre "Hallucinating Elvis" full of manufactured bounce, while gentle pop ballad "Someone Else, Not Me" featured few effects at all.  Heavy guitar pieces like "Last Day on Earth" and "Playing With Uranium" are juxtaposed with softer songs filled with delicate melancholy, like "Lady Xanax" and "The Sun Doesn't Shine Forever".

This album was poorly promoted and did not sell well, although the supporting concert tour sold out at almost all venues, including a week-long stint at the House of Blues in Los Angeles.  In March 2001, the band announced they had parted ways with Hollywood Records; Nick Rhodes said "Never was there a place that felt less like a record company: Seven giant dwarves hold up the building. You're listening to these people, and finally I had to say, 'How funny that your corporate logo is a large pair of ears, yet not one of you in here happens to have any.'"

Nick Rhodes later said that Pop Trash was the most difficult album for the band to make: "Things felt very different without John, although he departed during Medazzaland, he had been part of the initial writing sessions and played on several tracks of that album. Our writing process became very different for Pop Trash, also Simon was having difficulty with some of the lyrics at this time, so I ended up writing more of them than I would have anticipated. We had a new label, Hollywood Records, which proved to be, at best, exasperating. As we did not use a producer either, it resulted in Simon, Warren and I having to focus all of our ideas whilst not having a clear vision of what we were trying to achieve with the album. Given that background, we actually think the record turned out well and closed that era."

At the conclusion of the supporting tour for this album, Cuccurullo was dismissed, and the band reunited with its original five members.  Duran Duran went without a record deal for a couple of years, while recording their next album and doing extensive touring.  They finally signed with Epic Records, and released Astronaut in 2004, with greater success due to the reunion and promotion.

The song "Pop Trash Movie" was recorded first by American new wave band Blondie when they first reunited in 1997. This, and "Studio 54" (a homage to the New York City nightclub of the same name) were both written by Duran Duran. Both songs were the first new material the band released in fifteen years, but none of them were included in the 1998 album "No Exit".

Critical reception

Critics were generally unexcited by the album, as Metacritic gave it a 52 out of 100. Rob Sheffield of Rolling Stone said:

Stacia Proefrock of AllMusic said:

Chris Willman of Entertainment Weekly said:

A reviewer for Salon.com called Pop Trash "A mediocre Britpop album." while Q defended the album and said that "Pop Trash proves to be far from embarrassing." Another Negative review came from MTV.com who said that "Most of the album is, in fact, Pop Trash"

Ultimately, the album would become the band's lowest-selling album, and their last until 2004's Astronaut.

Singles
The lead single "Someone Else Not Me" peaked only at #53 in the UK, and didn't chart at all in United States.  However it made the top 10 in Latvia.  Le Bon also recorded versions of this song in Spanish ("Alguien Que No Soy Yo") and French ("Un Autre Que Moi").  The music video for the single was the first to be created entirely in Macromedia Flash digital animation.

The song "Playing With Uranium" was supposed to be released as a single in Italy only, but was available only as a radio promo.

The song "Last Day on Earth" was released in Japan; it was also played during the opening of the Universal Studios Japan theme park in Osaka.

Track listing
All songs written by Duran Duran.
 "Someone Else Not Me" – 4:48
 "Lava Lamp" – 3:54
 "Playing with Uranium" – 3:51
 "Hallucinating Elvis" – 5:26
 "Starting to Remember" – 2:38
 "Pop Trash Movie" – 4:54
 "Fragment" – 0:49
 "Mars Meets Venus" – 3:07
 "Lady Xanax" – 4:53
 "The Sun Doesn't Shine Forever" – 4:51
 "Kiss Goodbye" – 0:41
 "Last Day on Earth" – 4:27
Bonus tracks on various international releases:
 "Un Autre Que Moi" (French version of "Someone Else Not Me") – 4:19
 "Alguien Que No Soy Yo" (Spanish version of "Someone Else Not Me") – 4:16
 "Prototypes" – 6:17

Personnel
Duran Duran
 Simon Le Bon – vocals
 Warren Cuccurullo – guitar and bass
 Nick Rhodes – keyboards

Additional musicians
 David Campbell – arranger (strings)
 Sally Boyden – backing vocals
 Ariane Sherine – piano (track 6 & 10)
 John Tonks – drums, electric percussion
 Olivier Vieser – guitar
 Greg Bissonette – drums
 Steve Alexander – drums
 Luis Conte – percussion

Artwork and Photography
 Andrew Day

Charts

References

External Links

2000 albums
Duran Duran albums
Hollywood Records albums
albums arranged by David Campbell (composer)